Benaughlin Mountain, or simply Benaughlin, is a large hill in the Cuilcagh Mountain range in County Fermanagh, Northern Ireland. A section of the Ulster Way formerly passed around the side of Benaughlin, within 300 m of the summit until it was revised in 2009 and now instead ascends from Florencecourt.

The hill was originally called , which is thought to mean "peak of the speaking horse". Locals would climb the hill on the last Sunday of July for the festival of Lughnasa, and folklore tells of a large white horse which would appear on the hill each year and speak to them. Benaughlin is also associated with Donn na Binne ("Donn of the peak"), the legendary ancestor of the Mag Uidhir (Maguire) chiefs of Fermanagh and a king of the Sí. He is said to dwell in the mountain, and it was believed that whenever any of his real descendants die, a shard falls off its rocky face.

Benaughlin is also known as Bin Mountain to local residents.

The blanket bog which covers Benaughlin was used as a source of fuel for the wealthy landowners in the area who lived in the nearby stately home of Florence Court. A path known as the Donkey Trail meanders up the side of the mountain; this was the route used for bringing the turf down off the mountain side.

See also
 List of Marilyns in Northern Ireland

References

External links

 BBC Northern Ireland - Off the Beaten Track hike route with map

Mountains and hills of County Fermanagh
Marilyns of Northern Ireland